The Last Thanksgiving is a 2020 comedy horror film written and directed by Erick Lorinc. The film stars Samantha Ferrand as a waitress who works at a restaurant that is terrorized by cannibalistic pilgrims. The ensemble cast includes Madelin Marchant, Branden Holzer, Tristan Petashnick and Matthew McClure with a cameo by Scream Queen Linnea Quigley.

Plot summary
A restaurant, open for Thanksgiving, is attacked by cannibalistic pilgrims. When the dining staff fight back, carnage ensues.

Cast
 Samantha Ferrand as Lisa-Marie Taft
 Matthew McClure as Kurt Brimston
 Tristan Petashnick as Cordelia Brimston
 Branden Holzer as Eddie
 Robert Richards Jr. as Tyler
 Madelin Marchant as Ms. Perez
 Laura Finley as Maggie Brimston
 Michael Vitovich as Trip Brimston
 Bobby Eddy as Buddy
 Linnea Quigley as Paulette
 Tametria Harris as Mrs. Kim
 Francisco D Gonzalez as Mr. Pearl Sr.
 Alex Michell as Mouthless
 Gaby Spampinato as Trudie
 Nicholas Punales as Mr. Pearl
 Beth McClary as Mrs. Taft
 Mitch Collins as Mr. Taft

Production

The cast and crew were mainly undergrad students of the University of Miami and Miami locals.

Exteriors and a short film were filmed in November 2017 in Chattanooga, Tennessee before Principal Photography began.

Principal Photography took place on weekends from March to May 2018 in Miramar, Florida, Hollywood, Florida at Derry's Family Restaurant, and Miami, Florida.

Release
The film premiered online during the COVID-19 pandemic at the Pasadena Horror Film Festival, American Horror Film Festival, and Salem Horror Fest.

Scream Team Releasing released the film on Blu-ray and VHS in November 2020.

References 

2020 films
2020 comedy horror films
Thanksgiving horror films
American horror films
2020s English-language films
2020s American films